Mae Mallory (June 9, 1927 – 2007) was an activist of the Civil Rights Movement and a Black Power movement leader active in the 1950s and 1960s. She is best known as an advocate of school desegregation and of black armed self-defense.

Life
Mallory was born in Macon, Georgia, on June 9, 1927. She later went to live in New York City with her mother in 1939.

In 1956, Mallory was a founder and spokesperson of the "Harlem 9", a group of African-American mothers who protested the inferior and inadequate conditions in segregated New York City schools.  Inspired by a report by Kenneth and Mamie Clark on inexperienced teachers, overcrowded classrooms, dilapidated conditions, and gerrymandering to promote segregation in New York, the group sought to transfer their children to integrated schools that offered higher quality resources.

"Harlem 9" activism included lawsuits against the city and state, filed with the help of the National Association for the Advancement of Colored People (NAACP).  By 1958 it escalated to public protests and a 162-day boycott involving 10,000 parents. The boycott campaign did not win formal support from the NAACP, but was assisted by leaders such as Ella Baker and Adam Clayton Powell, and endorsed by African-American newspapers such as the Amsterdam News. While the children were engaged in another boycott in 1960, the campaign established some of the first Freedom Schools of the civil rights movement to educate them.

New York City retaliated against the mothers, trying and failing to prosecute them for negligence. In 1960, Mallory and the Harlem 9 won their lawsuit, and the Board of Education allowed them, and over a thousand other parents, to transfer their children to integrated schools.  That year, the Board of Education announced a general policy of Open Enrollment, and thousands more black children transferred to integrated schools over the next five years.  (Overall integration in the city was thwarted, however, by the practice of white flight.)

She supported Robert F. Williams, the Monroe, North Carolina NAACP chapter leader, and author of Negroes with Guns,  
During the Freedom Rides in August 1961, she worked with Williams in protecting Student Nonviolent Coordinating Committee (SNCC) activists who were demonstrating in Monroe.  This led to armed confrontations with white supremacists and allegations of kidnapping a white couple.

She went to Ohio, and was supported by the Monroe Defense Committee, and the Workers World Party, in her extradition and kidnapping trial. In 1961–65, she was jailed for kidnapping, but was later released after the North Carolina Supreme Court determined racial discrimination in the jury selection. COINTELPRO tried to break up the support group Committee to Support the Monroe Defendants.

She mentored Yuri Kochiyama.

She was a friend of Madalyn Murray O'Hair.
On February 21, 1965, Mallory was present at the assassination of Malcolm X at the Audubon Ballroom.
In April 1965, she was instrumental in a Times Square protest against the 1965 United States occupation of the Dominican Republic.
On August 8, 1966, she spoke at an anti-Vietnam War rally.

She was an organizer of the Sixth Pan-African Congress held in Dar es Salaam, Tanzania, in 1974. In 1974, she lived in Mwanza, Tanzania.

Her papers are held at the Walter P. Reuther Library at Wayne State University.

Works
 Letters from Prison, Mae Mallory. Monroe Defense Committee, c. 1962.
 Paula Marie Seniors, "Mae Mallory, The Monroe Defense Committee, and World Revolutions: "African American Women Radical Activists (1958-1987)," The University of Georgia Press, Forthcoming
 Paula Marie Seniors, "Mae Mallory and "The Southern Belle Fantasy Trope" at The Cuyahoga County Jail 21st and Payne PAIN," From Uncle Tom's Cabin to The Help: Critical Perspectives on White-Authored Narratives of Black Life, Claire Garcia, Vershawn Young, editors, Palgrave Macmillan, August 2014.
 A. T. Simpson, "After one year of hell Mae Mallory is still a champion", Workers World, October 26, 1962.

References

2007 deaths
1929 births
American civil rights activists
American Marxists
COINTELPRO targets
American community activists